Zephyr Independent School District is a public independent school district based in the community of Zephyr, Texas (U.S.).  Located in Brown County, the district extends into a small portion of Mills County and a very small portion of Comanche County.

Academic achievement
In 2009, the school district was rated "recognized" by the Texas Education Agency.

Schools
Zephyr ISD has two campuses - 
 Zephyr High School (Grades 7-12)
 Zephyr Elementary School (Grades K-6)

Special programs

Athletics
Zephyr High School plays six-man football.

See also

 List of school districts in Texas

References

External links
 

School districts in Brown County, Texas
School districts in Mills County, Texas
School districts in Comanche County, Texas